The 2000 Esso Formula Toyota season was the 11th season of the Formula Toyota and first season since the merger between the Main and West championships

Drivers

All cars are Toyota 4A-GE powered, Tom's built Toyota FT20's.

Event calendar and results

Final standings

External links
Schedule and results for the 2000 season

Formula Toyota
Formula Toyota